Robert Davis McKenzie (born 31 May 1950) is a former Australian rules footballer who played with Melbourne in the Victorian Football League (VFL). 

His father Bob McKenzie was a dual Melbourne Premiership player in the 1940s and 1950s.

Notes

External links 		

		
		
		
		
1950 births
Living people
Australian rules footballers from Victoria (Australia)		
Melbourne Football Club players